William Jones Jr. (born September 10, 1966) is a former American football running back who played three seasons with the Kansas City Chiefs of the National Football League (NFL). He was drafted by the Kansas City Chiefs in the 12th round of the 1989 NFL Draft. He first enrolled at Tyler Junior College before transferring to Southern Methodist University and lastly Texas State University. Jones attended Corsicana High School in Corsicana, Texas.

References

External links
 Just Sports Stats

1966 births
Living people
American football running backs
Kansas City Chiefs players
SMU Mustangs football players
Texas State Bobcats football players
Tyler Apaches football players
Sportspeople from Abilene, Texas
Players of American football from Texas
African-American players of American football
21st-century African-American people
20th-century African-American sportspeople